Catharosiini is a tribe of flies in the family Tachinidae, containing two genera. Catharosia is a genus of small flies, less than 2 mm in length, found worldwide, and contains about 12 species. Stackelbergomyia is a monotypic genus found in the Palearctic.

Genera
Catharosia Rondani, 1868
Stackelbergomyia Rohdendorf, 1948

References

Brachycera tribes
Phasiinae